Ardahan District (also: Merkez, meaning "central") is a district of Ardahan Province of Turkey. Its seat is the town Çıldır. Its area is 1,261 km2, and its population is 42,023 (2021).

Composition
There is one municipality in Ardahan District:
 Ardahan

There are 62 villages in Ardahan District:

 Açıkyazı
 Ağaçlı
 Ağzıpek
 Akyaka
 Alagöz
 Altaş
 Ardıçdere
 Aşağıkurtoğlu
 Bağdaşen
 Balıkçılar
 Bayramoğlu
 Beşiktaş
 Binbaşar
 Büyüksütlüce
 Çağlayık
 Çalabaş
 Çamlıçatak
 Çataldere
 Çatalköprü
 Çeğilli
 Çetinsu
 Çimenkaya
 Dağcı
 Dağevi
 Dedegül
 Değirmenli
 Derindere
 Edegül
 Gölgeli
 Güzçimeni
 Güzelyurt
 Hacıali
 Hasköy
 Höçvan Hasköy
 Kartalpınar
 Kazlıköy
 Kıraç
 Kocaköy
 Köprücük
 Küçüksütlüce
 Lehimli
 Meşedibi
 Nebioğlu
 Ölçek
 Ömerağa
 Ortageçit
 Otbiçen
 Ovapınar
 Samanbeyli
 Sarıyamaç
 Sugöze
 Sulakyurt
 Taşlıdere
 Tazeköy
 Tepeler
 Tepesuyu
 Tunçoluk
 Uzunova
 Yalnızçam
 Yaylacık
 Yokuşdibi
 Yukarıkurtoğlu

References

Districts of Ardahan Province